Net TV may refer to:

 Internet TV, or streaming television
 Net TV (Argentina), a TV network
 NET (Indonesian TV network)
 NET (Maltese TV channel)
 Nea Elliniki Tileorasi, now ERT2, a Greek TV network
 Net TV Nepal, an online service
 New Evangelization Television, or NET-TV, an American Catholic TV network
 National Educational Television, an American educational TV network
 National Empowerment Television, an American conservative TV network
 Nebraska Educational Telecommunications, an American public broadcaster
 Nihon Educational Television, former name of Japanese TV network TV Asahi
 Sociedad Gestora de Televisión Net TV, a Spanish digital terrestrial TV licensee

See also

Netti (disambiguation)
Netty (disambiguation)
 WNET, an American TV channel owned by WNET (formerly Educational Broadcasting Corporation)